Note: There are independent bookstores named "Left Bank Books" in Belfast, Maine, in St. Louis, and in New York City.

Left Bank Books Collective is an anarchist bookstore, founded in 1973, in Seattle, Washington. It is located at 92 Pike Street, in the Corner Market building at Pike Place Market. Its Lonely Planet review states that it "displays zines in español, revolutionary pamphlets, essays by Chomsky and an inherent suspicion of authority."

The store hosts occasional events that are described among the "top 15 things to do this week" or similar reviews in Seattle.  It is also a small publisher and it ran an IndieGoGo fundraising campaign in 2014, when it had been operating for 40 years.

References

External links

Official site
Facebook page

1973 establishments in Washington (state)
Anarchist bookstores
Bookstores established in the 20th century
Independent bookstores of the United States
Infoshops
Worker cooperatives of the United States
Pike Place Market
Central Waterfront, Seattle